The 2006 Mecca hostel collapse occurred in Mecca, Saudi Arabia on 5 January 2006. A hostel housing Muslim pilgrims performing Hajj collapsed, killing 76 people and injuring 62.

Hostel
The four-storey hostel, Lulu'at al-Khair, situated on al-Ghazal Street, just  from the walls of Masjid al-Haram, was in demand as the Hajj was about to begin, and at least 30 people were known to be staying there. As well as housing Hajjis, the building also contains a restaurant and shops. At its base it is surrounded by market stalls. The building was at least 25 years old and its operator, Habib Turkestani, claims that the building was structurally sound and in "good shape".

Collapse
According to reports, prior to the collapse a fire was seen spreading downstairs in the building. The fire alarm went off and sprinklers were in operation. The building was not full, as many of the occupants had made their way to the Masjid al Haram for mid-day Salat. As soon as the collapse happened, nearby people began to dig to try to remove the rubble. Up to one thousand Saudi rescue workers were dispatched, and two large cranes were brought in to try to clear the masonry. People in buildings nearby were evacuated as a precaution.

Victims
Originally, the Saudi government declared that thirteen people had died, but this figure quickly rose, settling at seventy-six. Most of those who died were passers-by, people shopping in the markets or returning from the Masjid al Haram after Salat. Most were foreign nationals from Arab and Asian nations. The dead were buried in the Jannatul Mualla cemetery in Mecca, where Muslims believe Muhammad's sahaba will rise again on the day of Judgement.

See also

Incidents during the Hajj

References

External links
 Pilgrim hostel collapses in Mecca (BBC)

Building collapses in 2006
Incidents during the Hajj
21st century in Mecca
Mecca
Mecca
Building collapses in Saudi Arabia
Building collapses caused by fire